The 2014 Shanghai Challenger was a professional tennis tournament played on hard courts. It was the fourth edition of the tournament which was part of the 2014 ATP Challenger Tour. It took place in Shanghai, China between 1 and 7 September 2014.

Singles main-draw entrants

Seeds

 1 Rankings are as of August 25, 2014.

Other entrants
The following players received wildcards into the singles main draw:
  Bai Yan 
  Chuhan Wang 
  Wei Qiang Zheng 
  Su Hao Zhong

The following players entered using a protected ranking:
  John Millman
  Jose Rubin Statham

The following players received entry from the qualifying draw:
  Yuichi Ito
  Sanam Singh 
  Kento Takeuchi 
  Li Zhe

Champions

Singles

 Yoshihito Nishioka def.  Somdev Devvarman 6–4, 6–7(5–7), 7–6(7–3)

Doubles

 Yuki Bhambri /  Divij Sharan def.  Somdev Devvarman /  Sanam Singh 7–6(7–2), 6–7(4–7), [10–8]

External links

Shanghai Challenger
Shanghai Challenger
Shanghai Challenger
Shanghai Challenger